Lillias White (born July 21, 1951) is an American actress and singer. She is particularly known for her performances in Broadway musicals. In 1989 she won an Obie Award for her performance in the Off-Broadway musical Romance in Hard Times. In 1997 she won the Tony Award for Best Featured Actress in a Musical and Drama Desk Award for Outstanding Featured Actress in a Musical for portraying Sonja in Cy Coleman's The Life. She was nominated for a Tony Award again in 2010 for her work as Funmilayo in Fela Kuti's Fela!.

White is also known for her roles as Calliope in the Disney film Hercules (1997), and its animated series of the same name; Evette in the film Pieces of April (2003); and as Fat Annie in the Netflix series The Get Down. She has also starred as Bloody Mary in Rodgers and Hammerstein's South Pacific on PBS' Great Performances with Reba McEntire, and in the PBS documentary In Performance at the White House. She is an active cabaret singer and has appeared in concert with the Boston Pops Orchestra, the Brooklyn Philharmonic, and at Carnegie Hall.

Career

Theater
White is a Brooklyn, New York native who made her Broadway debut in Barnum in 1981.  She understudied the role of Effie in the original 1981 production of Dreamgirls and played the part in the 1987 revival, for which she won the Drama League Award for Best Actress in a Musical.

White has also appeared on Broadway in Cats, Carrie, Once on This Island, How to Succeed in Business Without Really Trying, Chicago, and Fela!. For her role in Cy Coleman's The Life, she won the Tony, Drama Desk, and Outer Critics Circle Awards for her portrayal of a world-weary, no-nonsense, streetwise hooker named Sonja.  Off-Broadway White has performed in the Public Theater production of the William Finn musical Romance in Hard Times (1989), for which she won the Obie Award, Dinah Was (1998) at the Gramercy Theatre as singer Dinah Washington, and the Second Stage Theatre production of Regina Taylor's musical Crowns (2002), for which she and the cast won the AUDELCO Award, Outstanding Ensemble Performance. In 2014, White appeared Off-Broadway in the Primary Stages production of the play While I Yet Live by Billy Porter. In 2015, White starred with Scott Wakefield Off-Broadway in the York Theatre Company's World premiere of Alan Govenar's musical Texas in Paris.

White, André De Shields, Stefanie Powers, and Georgia Engel appeared in the new musical Gotta Dance, directed and choreographed by Jerry Mitchell, which began performances on December 13, 2015, at Chicago's Bank of America Theatre, and ran through January 17, 2016.

In August 2022, it was announced that White would play the role of Hermes in the Broadway musical Hadestown beginning on September 13, 2022. She is the first woman to play the role.

Controversy
During a performance of Hadestown on October 12, 2022, White twice reprimanded an audience member from the stage for recording the production. White was unaware that this audience member was not recording, and was in fact using a captioning device because she was disabled and needed it to understand the dialogue of the musical. The theatre and production issued official apologies, affirmed their future commitments to accessibility, and offered a complimentary ticket to the audience member to make up for the incident. White refused to apologize for the incident herself, while the audience member took to social media to urge users to stop harassing White, as the actress's social media profiles had been deluged with ageist and racist insults in response to the incident.

Concerts and cabaret
White's concert performances to benefit the Actors' Fund of America include Dreamgirls in 2001, Funny Girl in 2002, and  Hair in 2004. She performed in the concert version of South Pacific, which was broadcast by PBS Great Performances in 2006. She performed with the Brooklyn Philharmonic in a concert of works by Leonard Bernstein, Aaron Copland, and George and Ira Gershwin celebrating the orchestra's 50th anniversary in July 2003. She also has appeared in concert at  Carnegie Hall, in March 2004, singing Harold Arlen songs with the New York Pops. White performed her one-woman show at the Kennedy Center's "Barbara Cook's Spotlight" in November 2007, singing songs by Cy Coleman. At the New York Public Library for the Performing Arts at Lincoln Center she performed in a concert, Broadway's Future Songbook, in September 2014. She has toured with her one-woman cabaret show From Brooklyn to Broadway, which she first presented in March 2000 at Arci's Place in New York City. She performed the show in San Francisco in 2003 at the Plush Room.

She is heard on the 1990 Madonna recording "Rescue Me".

Television and film
White's television appearances include a regular role on Sesame Street, Law & Order, Law & Order: Special Victims Unit, and NYPD Blue. Her screen credits include voiceover work in Disney's Hercules and Anastasia and appearances in How the Grinch Stole Christmas, Game 6, Pieces of April and Then She Found Me.

Personal life 
White was raised Catholic.

Awards and nominations

Filmography

Film

Television

Video games

References

External links
 
 
 

1951 births
Actresses from New York City
African-American actresses
American gospel singers
American voice actresses
Drama Desk Award winners
Tony Award winners
Living people
Musicians from Brooklyn
American television actresses
American film actresses
20th-century African-American women singers
American musical theatre actresses
African-American Catholics
21st-century African-American people
21st-century African-American women